The following is a complete list of presidents of Molise.  Molise is a region of Southern Italy established in 1970. Prior to then, it was part of the region of Abruzzi e Molise

Prior to the 1995 election, the president was not directly elected, and was routinely a member of the  Christian Democracy party (DC), the party which had dominated elections for the Regional Council of Molise and across Italy since the establishment of the Italian Republic as of the 1946 election.

Elected by the Regional Council (1970–2000)

Directly-elected presidents (since 2000)

Government of Molise
Politics of Molise
Molise